This article is about the particular significance of the year 1707 to Wales and its people.

Incumbents
Lord Lieutenant of North Wales (Lord Lieutenant of Anglesey, Caernarvonshire, Denbighshire, Flintshire, Merionethshire, Montgomeryshire) – Hugh Cholmondeley, 1st Earl of Cholmondeley
Lord Lieutenant of South Wales (Lord Lieutenant of Glamorgan, Brecknockshire, Cardiganshire, Carmarthenshire, Monmouthshire, Pembrokeshire, Radnorshire) – Thomas Herbert, 8th Earl of Pembroke

Bishop of Bangor –  John Evans
Bishop of Llandaff – John Tyler
Bishop of St Asaph – William Beveridge
Bishop of St Davids – George Bull

Events
1 May - The Acts of Union come into force, making Wales officially a part of the Kingdom of Great Britain. The newly-established Parliament of Great Britain has a total of 27 MPs representing Welsh constituencies, as opposed to 45 for Scotland and 486 for England.
December - Richard Bulkeley, 4th Viscount Bulkeley, is accused of having appropriated building materials from Beaumaris Castle for use on his own estates.

Arts and literature

New books
Egwyddorion y Grefydd Gristianogawl
Godidawgrwydd Rhinwedd
Edward Lhuyd - Archaeologia Britannica: an Account of the Languages, Histories and Customs of Great Britain, from Travels through Wales, Cornwall, Bas-Bretagne, Ireland and Scotland. Vol. 1: Glossography Lhuyd's work was compiled with assistance from Moses Williams, and was dedicated to Thomas Mansel, 1st Baron Mansel.

Births
1 February - Frederick, Prince of Wales, son of the future George II of Great Britain (died 1751)
April? - Griffith Hughes, naturalist and author (died c.1758)
1 September - John Salusbury, explorer and diarist (died 1762)
30 September - Richard Trevor, Bishop of St David's (died 1771)
probable
Thomas Allgood II, heir to the Pontypool japanning works, who would make further improvements to the process
William Vaughan of Corsygedol, politician (died 1775)

Deaths
14 December - Humphrey Edwin, London merchant and owner of the Llanmihangel estate, 65
date unknown - Love Parry, ancestor of the Jones-Parry Baronets, 53

See also
1707 in Scotland

References

1700s in Wales
Years of the 18th century in Wales